"Too Late for Love" is a song by Swedish singer John Lundvik. The song was performed for the first time in Melodifestivalen 2019, where it made it to the final. It is Lundvik's first single since "My Turn", and reached number one on the Sverigetopplistan singles chart in March 2019. It eventually won Melodifestivalen 2019, and represented Sweden at the Eurovision Song Contest 2019 in Tel Aviv, Israel. It was performed during the second semi-final on 16 May 2019, and qualified for the final. It finished in fifth place with 334 points.

Melodifestivalen
Being Lundvik's second participation in the Swedish Eurovision selection, "Too Late for Love" participated in the fourth semi-final of the 2019 Melodifestivalen which was held in Lidköping's Sparbanken Lidköping Arena on 23 February 2019. The song was performed last at the semi-final and it direct qualified to the final. On 9 March, during the final at the Friends Arena in Stockholm, Lundvik performed the song at the tenth position of the running order. "Too Late for Love" won the selection with 96 points from the international juries (only song at Melodifestivalen to have received 12 points from all the jury groups) and 85 points from the public vote, receiving 181 points in total.

Eurovision Song Contest

The song was performed on 16 May 2019 in the first half of the second semi-final of Eurovision Song Contest in Tel Aviv, Israel. It qualified for the final, which was held on 18 May 2019. It finished in fifth place with 334 points.

Among other songs it competed against the entry from the United Kingdom, "Bigger than Us", also written by John Lundvik, and originally intended to be performed by Lundvik in Melodifestivalen.

Charts

Weekly charts

Year-end charts

Certifications

References 

2019 singles
English-language Swedish songs
Eurovision songs of 2019
Eurovision songs of Sweden
John Lundvik songs
Melodifestivalen songs of 2019
Number-one singles in Sweden
Songs written by John Lundvik
Songs written by Wrethov
Swedish pop songs
Warner Music Group singles